Eugene C. Fitzhugh  (May 11, 1926 - August 21, 2007) was a Little Rock, Arkansas lawyer and businessman.

On June 23, 1994, he pleaded guilty to trying to bribe David Hale. In exchange for his bribery plea, he was sentenced to 28 months, and prosecutors dropped charges accusing him of conspiring to defraud the Small Business Administration. He also received one year of probation, a $3,000.00 fine and lost his law license. The guilty plea was part of Kenneth Starr's probe into what is known as the Whitewater investigation and report. He came into front page national news as a result of the Whitewater investigations. He was sentenced with his colleague Charles Matthews.

David Hale is a former Arkansas municipal judge, a former Arkansas banker and a witness in the Whitewater scandal trials.

References

 CBS News, Caught In The Whitewater Net, Washington, May 19, 1998
 The NY Times, First Trial for Whitewater Prosecutor, June 20, 1994
 USA Today obituary

External links
CBS
NY Times

Lawyers from Little Rock, Arkansas
1926 births
2007 deaths
Whitewater controversy
Businesspeople from Little Rock, Arkansas